Pyawbwe is a village in Kyaukse District of the Mandalay Division in central Myanmar.

External links
 "Pyawywa Map — Satellite Images of Pyawywa" Maplandia

Populated places in Mandalay Region